Flower class may refer to:
 Flower-class sloop, sloops of the Royal Navy serving in World War I
 Flower-class corvette, corvettes of the Royal Navy, Royal Canadian Navy and other navies, serving in World War II
 GWR 4100 Class, steam locomotives of the Great Western Railway